Enrico Adolph (born 17 January 1992 in Johannesburg) is a South African football player who played as a left-back.

References

1992 births
Living people
Sportspeople from Johannesburg
Cape Coloureds
South African soccer players
Association football defenders
Bidvest Wits F.C. players
Mpumalanga Black Aces F.C. players
Vasco da Gama (South Africa) players
African Games silver medalists for South Africa
African Games medalists in football
Competitors at the 2011 All-Africa Games